Rutherford County Schools is a school district based in Murfreesboro, Tennessee, United States. It serves Rutherford County, Tennessee—excluding pre-kindergarten through 6th grade in Murfreesboro itself, which is served by the Murfreesboro City Schools system.

The district gained national attention during the COVID-19 pandemic when local high school student Grady Knox was harassed by district meeting attendees after explaining that his grandmother had died due to the lack of mask-wearing in local schools. Outgoing school board chairman Coy Young subsequently apologized, stating his "regret the young man was treated the way he was."

Schools

Elementary schools

 Barfield Elementary School
 Blackman Elementary School
 Brown's Chapel Elementary School  
 Buchanan Elementary School
 Cedar Grove Elementary School
 Christiana Elementary School
 David Youree Elementary School
 Eagleville School (PK–12)
 Homer Pittard Campus School (K–6)
 John Colemon Elementary School
 Kittrell Elementary School
 Lascassas Elementary School
 Lavergne Lake Elementary School
 Roy Waldron Annex (PK–1)
 McFadden School of Excellence (K–5)
 Rock Springs Elementary School
 Rockvale Elementary School (PK–5)
 Rocky Fork Elementary School (PK-5)
 Roy L. Waldron Elementary School (2–5)
 Smyrna Elementary School
 Smyrna Primary School
 Stewarts Creek Elementary School
 Stewartsboro Elementary School
 Thurman Francis Arts Academy (K–8)
 Walter Hill Elementary School
 Wilson Elementary School

Middle schools

 Blackman Middle School est. 2002
 Christiana Middle School
 Eagleville School (PK–12)
 La Vergne Middle School
 Oakland Middle School
 Rock Springs Middle School
 Rocky Fork Middle School est.2017
 Rockvale Middle School (6–8)
 Siegel School
 Smyrna Middle School
 Stewarts Creek Middle School
 Thurman Francis Arts Academy (K–8)
 Whitworth-Buchanan Middle School

High schools

 Blackman High School est. 2000
 Central Magnet School (6-12) est. 2010
 Eagleville School (PK-12) est. 1996
 Holloway High School est. 1928
 La Vergne High School est. 1988
 Oakland High School 1972
 Riverdale High School 1972
 Rockvale High School est. 2019
 Siegel High School est. 2003
 Smyrna High School est. 1919
 Stewarts Creek High School (Smyrna) est. 2013

Other schools
 Daniel McKee Alternative School (8–12)
 Rutherford County Adult High School
 Smyrna West School (7–12)
 Rutherford County Virtual School (3-12)

References

External links
 Official site

Education in Rutherford County, Tennessee
School districts in Tennessee